Kaboli (also Romanized as Kābolī) is a village in Mazul Rural District, in the Central District of Nishapur County, Razavi Khorasan Province, Iran. At the 2006 census, its population was 583, in 151 families.

References 

Populated places in Nishapur County